Moham is a 1974 Indian Malayalam film, directed and produced by Rander Guy. The film stars Sudheer, Raghavan, Baby Sumathi and Janardanan in the lead roles. The film had musical score by M. K. Arjunan.

Cast
Sudheer
Raghavan
Baby Sumathi
Janardanan
Kavitha
Kuthiravattam Pappu
Radhadevi
Sreelatha Namboothiri

Soundtrack
The music was composed by M. K. Arjunan and the lyrics were written by P. Bhaskaran.

References

External links
 

1974 films
1970s Malayalam-language films